EWWL Trocal League for the season 2003–04 was the third season of the EWWL Trocal league. Attended by eleven teams from five countries, a champion for the first time in history, became the team Gospić Industrogradnja. In this season, clubs from Serbia and Montenegro, Bosnia and Herzegovina, Croatia, Slovenia and Austria took part.

EWWL Trocal League for the season 2003–04 has begun to play 4 October 2003 and ended on 22 February 2004, when he it was completed a Regular season. Final Four to be played from 12–13 March 2004. in Gospić in Croatia. Winner Final Four this season for the team Gospić Croatia Osiguranje from Croatia.

Team information

Regular season
The League of the season was played with 11 teams and play a dual circuit system, each with each one game at home and away. The four best teams at the end of the regular season were placed in the Final Four. The regular season began on 4 October 2003 and it will end on 22 February 2004.

Final four
Final Four to be played from 12–13 March 2004. in the Gradska Školska Sportska Dvorana in Gospić, Croatia.

Awards
Finals Four MVP: Vanda Baranović-Urukalo of Gospić Industrogradnja

References

External links
 2003-04 EWWL Trocal league

2003-04
2003–04 in European women's basketball leagues
2003–04 in Serbian basketball
2003–04 in Bosnia and Herzegovina basketball
2003–04 in Slovenian basketball
2003 in Austrian sport
2003–04 in Croatian basketball